Raffaele D'Aquino (born 23 November 1903 in Trani) was an Italian professional football player.

He played for 4 seasons (87 games, no goals) in the Serie A for A.S. Roma.

1903 births
Year of death missing
Italian footballers
Serie A players
Novara F.C. players
A.S. Roma players
Pisa S.C. players
F.C. Grosseto S.S.D. players
Italian football managers
Cagliari Calcio managers
U.S. Città di Pontedera players
Association football midfielders